Government Vellore Medical College (GVMC) or Government Vellore Medical College Hospital (GVMCH) is a Medical Council of India (MCI) recognised medical college located at Adukkamparai, Vellore city in Tamil Nadu.  It is about 8 km from Vellore Town Bus Terminus. Established in 2005, it is a relatively new medical college in Tamil Nadu offering an MCI recognised Bachelor of Medicine, Bachelor of Surgery (MBBS), General Medicine MD, and General Surgery MS courses., MS Obstetrics and Gynaecology, MD Anaesthesiology, MD Pediatrics.

History
The hospital site had previously hosted a tuberculosis sanatorium, when plans for starting the college began in 1997. The college began admitting students in 2005. The medical college is affiliated to the Tamil Nadu Dr. M.G.R. Medical University.

Admissions
Every year, students are admitted through a counselling process conducted by The Directorate of Medical Education, Tamil Nadu. Total number of students admitted per year are 100, with 15% of seats reserved for admissions through all India quota.

Popularity
GVMC has been listed in top ten emerging medical colleges in India, by a survey conducted by India Today. GVMC is ranked 6 among top ten colleges.

Services
Special investigative facilities available in the hospital are magnetic resonance imaging, X-ray computed tomography, echocardiography, and cardiac stress test. Other available services are comprehensive emergency maternal and obstetrics and neonatal care, anti-retroviral therapy and an integrated counselling testing centre, Neonatal Intensive Care Unit, Pediatric Intensive Care Unit, Tamil Nadu Accident and Emergency Initiative.

References

External links
 www.gvmc.in The official website of Government Vellore Medical College

Medical colleges in Tamil Nadu
Universities and colleges in Vellore district
Educational institutions established in 2005
2005 establishments in Tamil Nadu